Philippe Besson (born 29 January 1967 in Barbezieux-Saint-Hilaire, Charente) is a French writer.

Life
In 1999, Besson, a law graduate, was inspired to write his first novel, En l'absence des hommes while reading of accounts of ex-servicemen during the First World War.
The novel, with its daring inclusion of Marcel Proust as a central character, won the Prix Emmanuel Roblès.
Besson's second novel, Son Frère was shortlisted for the Prix Femina, and adapted for cinema by Patrice Chéreau in 2003.
The film was well received and won the Silver Bear at the Berlin Film Festival.

Works
En l'absence des hommes, Éditions Julliard, 2001, 
In the Absence of Men, Heinemann 2003, translated by Frank Wynne, Carroll & Graf, 2003, 
Son frère, Julliard, 2001, 
His Brother translated by Frank Wynne, Heinemann, 2004, 
 L'arrière saison, Julliard, 2002,   (inspired by Edward Hopper's painting Nighthawks)
 Un garçon d'Italie, Julliard, 2003,   (which was shortlisted for both the Prix Goncourt and the Prix Médicis.)
 Les Jours fragiles, Julliard, 2004,   (focussing on the last days of Rimbaud, it has been optioned by François Dupeyron for the cinema.)
 Un instant d'abandon: roman, Julliard, 2005, 
 Se résoudre aux adieux: roman, Julliard, 2007, 
The Accidental Man
Arrête avec tes mensonges, Éditions Julliard, 2017, 
Lie with Me translated by Molly Ringwald, Scribner, 2019, 
 Un Personnage de Roman - Macron par Besson, French and European Publications Inc, 2017,

References

External links
"Review: In the Absence of Men by Philippe Besson", Speak its name

1967 births
French bisexual writers
Living people
People from Charente
Bisexual men
French LGBT novelists
21st-century French novelists
French male novelists
Prix Emmanuel Roblès recipients
21st-century French male writers